Tidal (stylized in all caps) is a Norwegian-American subscription-based audio streaming service that also streams music videos. Tidal was launched in 2014 by Swedish public company Aspiro which is now majority-owned by Block, Inc., an American payment processing company.

With distribution agreements with all three major record labels and many independent labels, Tidal claims to provide access to more than 80 million tracks and 350,000 music videos. It offers two levels of service: Tidal HiFi (up to CD quality – FLAC-based 16-bit/44.1 kHz) and Tidal HiFi Plus (up to MQA – 24-bit/96 kHz). Tidal claims to pay the highest percentage of royalties to music artists and songwriters within the music streaming market.

In March 2015, Aspiro was acquired by Project Panther Bidco Ltd., which relaunched the service with a mass-marketing campaign, promoting it as the first artist-owned streaming service. In January 2017, Sprint Corporation bought 33% of Tidal for a reported $200 million. In March 2021, Block, then known as Square, agreed to pay $297 million for majority ownership of Tidal. In June, 2022, through the disclosure of the Annual Stockholder Meeting 2022, Block reported that the stake acquired in the Tidal music service was 86.8%.

While some observers praised the high-fidelity audio quality, and higher subscription fees that would result in higher royalties to the artists and songwriters, others felt the high subscription fees and exclusive Tidal content from the artists involved could lead to more music piracy. Tidal claimed to have over 3 million subscribers in 2016, although the veracity of those claims and the company's reported streaming numbers have been questioned. , Tidal operates in 61 countries.

History 
Branching off from WiMP, which was launched in Norway in 2010 and later available in Sweden, Denmark, Germany, and Poland, Aspiro launched the Tidal brand in the UK, the US, and Canada on October 28, 2014. The launch was supported by Sonos and 15 other home audio manufacturers as integration partners. In January 2015, Tidal launched in five more European countries: Ireland, Finland, the Netherlands, Belgium and Luxembourg.

Aspiro was purchased by Project Panther Bidco Ltd. (controlled by American rapper and businessman Jay-Z) for SEK 466 million (USD $56.2 million) in January 2015. Before the acquisition of Aspiro, Jay-Z stated in an interview with Billboard that he was willing to partner with other streaming services to carry out his vision. "We talked to every single service and we explored all the options," he said, "But at the end of the day, we figured if we're going to shape this thing the way we see it, then we need to have independence. And that became a better proposition for us, not an easier one, mind you," he concluded.

On April 16, 2015, it came to public attention that Tidal was closing its original Aspiro offices in Stockholm, terminating the employment for all Swedish employees and the CEO, Andy Chen. The company refused to comment on closing the offices but confirmed that Andy Chen had been replaced as CEO by Peter Tonstad. In September 2015, Tidal began selling digital downloads and CDs. In December 2015, Tidal appointed Jeff Toig as CEO of the company. Toig left the company in March 2017. Richard Sanders was announced as CEO in August 2017.

In January 2017, the company announced a partnership with British company Master Quality Authenticated (MQA) which they claim delivers master-quality recordings at typically 96 kHz / 24-bit with the highest possible resolution to its HiFi subscribers. Tidal is the only streaming company to offer MQA. MQA is a lossy format. On January 23, 2017, US mobile carrier Sprint announced that they were buying a 33 percent stake in Tidal, and it was reported that Sprint would offer exclusive content to Sprint customers. In September 2017, Tidal partnered with Mercedes-Benz's web portal app. American rapper Nicki Minaj starred in a commercial promoting the Mercedes partnership. The catalog available in MQA on Tidal currently comprises certain albums and singles from Universal Music Group, Warner Music Group, its affiliates and certain independent distributors, including AvidPlay service provided by Avid Technology. Since November 2020, the largest part of the MQA catalog available on Tidal is that of Warner Music Group and its affiliates, which was made available as part of a new deal with MQA and Warner Music Group itself. In the past, Sony Music also offered certain albums and singles from their catalog in MQA on Tidal, but their quality were later reduced; exceptions include Beyoncé's albums Lemonade and Homecoming: The Live Album, both released by Parkwood Entertainment and distributed by Sony Music's label Columbia Records (likely most possible reason of these exceptions is Tidal's ownership — Jay-Z is Beyoncé's husband).

In 2017, Tidal announced a series of podcasts to launch the same year. American rappers Fat Joe and Joey Badass each host "Coca Vision" and "47 Minutes" respectively.

In July 2019, Tidal expanded their credits feature and launched interactive official music credits on the platform, allowing user to click on musicians and other contributors. These credits are supplied by the labels and artists direct to Tidal.

On March 2, 2021, it was announced that financial technology company Square, Inc. had reached an agreement to acquire majority ownership of Tidal. Square would pay $297 million in cash and stock for Tidal, and Jay-Z would have a board position. Jay-Z and other artists who own stocks in Tidal would remain stakeholders.

In November 2021, Tidal introduced a free tier for the first time, though exclusively for the United States. CD-quality HiFi audio was also introduced to all paid plans, while keeping MQA-quality audio exclusive for the new HiFi Plus plan.

Platform exclusivity 
A key selling point for Tidal as compared with other streaming services such as Spotify and Pandora Radio is the exclusive content already available and expected for the future from the current artists who co-own the company, as well as others. Exclusive content available on the relaunch of Tidal included Rihanna's single "Bitch Better Have My Money", The White Stripes debut television appearance, Daft Punk's Electroma (2006), and playlists personally curated by Jay-Z, Beyoncé, Arcade Fire and Coldplay. Tidal stated on its official Twitter page that "lots of exclusive content [is] on the way".

Jay-Z's catalogue was not available on Spotify but was almost entirely exclusive on Tidal until his 50th birthday.

Artist ownership 
During the press conference, Jay-Z, Beyoncé, Rihanna, Kanye West, Nicki Minaj, Daft Punk, Jack White, Madonna, Arcade Fire, Alicia Keys, Usher, Chris Martin, Calvin Harris, deadmau5, Jason Aldean and J. Cole were introduced to the stage as "the owners of TIDAL". Eric Harvey of Pitchfork stated of the artists who co-own the service, "These are the 1 percent of pop music in the world right now, these are artists who do not answer to record labels, do not answer to corporations."

On March 30, 2015, a press conference was held at Skylight at Moynihan Station in New York City, to relaunch Tidal officially. The conference started with a brief introduction and explanation of Tidal. After introducing the aforementioned sixteen artist co-owners of Tidal onstage, recording artist Alicia Keys spoke on behalf of the artists and for Tidal. She stated, "So we come together before you on this day, March 30th, 2015, with one voice in unity in the hopes that today will be another one of those moments in time, a moment that will forever change the course of music history." Keys also described the event as like a "graduation". At the end of the press conference, all artists onstage signed a declaration, which stated Tidal's mission. Tidal claimed to have gained 100,000 new subscribers following the press conference revealing the artists involved in the service.

In June 2015, Lil Wayne joined the service's roster as an artist co-owner, kicking off the partnership by exclusively releasing a track on the service called "Glory". On February 23, 2016, T.I. joined the service's roster as the latest co-owner, kicking off the partnership by releasing "Money Talk", a single from his tenth album, Dime Trap, exclusively on the service as well as the album was streamed live from Greenbriar Mall in Atlanta.

On July 1, 2017, it was reported Kanye West left Tidal as co-owner and shareholder, after a financial argument with its board of directors regarding compensation for his contributions to the company. West later demanded payment from Tidal of $3 million for his inclusion on marketing efforts, video production, and claiming the release of his 2016 album, The Life of Pablo, being the reason for Tidal's 1.5 million subscriber increase soon following the release. In response, Tidal stated West failed to deliver the videos he promised on his contract.

Releases 
In April 2015, Tidal exclusives included Beyoncé releasing a video of her performing "Die With You", a never-before-heard original song, dedicated to her and Jay-Z's wedding anniversary, Madonna releasing a teaser of her upcoming music video at the time for "Ghosttown" and Rihanna debuting her brand new song and music video "American Oxygen".

In January 2016, Tidal released Rihanna's Anti as a one-week exclusive stream. In February 2016, Tidal secured an exclusive initial release with Kanye West's The Life of Pablo. West went on to vow that the album would "never appear on any other services [than Tidal]", nor would it ever be for sale. On April 23, 2016, Beyoncé released her second visual album, Lemonade, for streaming exclusively on Tidal. On April 25, it was made available for purchase by track or album on Amazon Music and the iTunes store and on May 6, it arrived at physical retailers.

Jay-Z's 2017 album 4:44 debuted on Tidal. The next year, Jay-Z released a collaborative album with Beyoncé, Everything Is Love, via Tidal.

Livestreaming 
Tidal regularly streams concerts live and on-demand including the Made in America festival and TIDAL X Brooklyn. In 2018, Tidal live-streamed Hot 97's 25th annual Summer Jam. Also in 2018, Tidal partnered with Equal Justice Initiative to live-stream The Concert for Peace and Justice. The concert commemorated the opening of The National Memorial for Peace and Justice and The Legacy Museum, both located in Montgomery, Alabama.

Reception 
Shortly after Tidal's launch and press conference, the mobile version of the service shot to the top 20 of the U.S. iPhone Apps chart. Following criticism for its "out-of-touch marketing campaign", two weeks later, the app had already fallen out of the top 700 rankings of the same list.

Praise 
Glenn Peoples of Billboard wrote that Tidal was a good thing for the music industry. He stated that the U.S. streaming market needed a "kick in the butt" when looking at the growth rate of streaming from 2014 to 2015. Peoples also noted that more competition in the streaming market is a good thing as it could lead to a "greater diffusion of innovation". He concluded that a service like Tidal – which is promoted as paying a fair amount of royalties to both the artists and the songwriters – will lead to the industry as a whole sorting out its issues with streaming royalties.

Criticism 
Writing for USA Todays website, Micah Peters released a list of "3 reasons why Jay-Z's new Tidal streaming service is stupid". The article focused on points that the high fidelity, the lossless audio quality model being promoted was "overestimat[ing] the average listener". Peters worried that most listeners do not have the required, advanced headphones to distinguish the difference between ordinary and high-fidelity audio (Hi-Fi). The article also stated that the $20 price was not reasonable for the mass market.

Recording artist Lily Allen expressed her opinions on Tidal on her official Twitter account. She feared that the high price of Tidal, as well as the mass popularity of the artist co-owners, could result in crippling the music industry and increasing piracy. She stated, "I love Jay-Z so much, but Tidal is (so) expensive compared to other perfectly good streaming services, he's taken the biggest artists… Made them exclusive to Tidal (am I right in thinking this?), people are going to swarm back to pirate sites in droves".

Jay-Z responded to criticism with a freestyle during the Tidal X: Jaÿ-Z B-Sides concert. He compares Tidal with Apple and Nike and says that Tidal has been subjected to hypocritical criticism.

Kanye West's decision to initially release his album The Life of Pablo as a Tidal streaming exclusive led to criticism from fans, who felt that streaming exclusivity could promote piracy. The album was pirated over 500,000 times as of February 17, 2016. West later made the album available to stream on competing services. In July 2017, West terminated his contract with Tidal, claiming that the service owed him $3 million.

Finances and royalties 
One artist has stated that artist royalties per track from Aspiro/Tidal are currently over three times than those paid by Spotify, but that royalties may decrease to provide a sufficient return on investment. Jay-Z commented in an interview to Billboard that artists would be paid more by being streamed on Tidal than with Spotify, stating "Will artists make more money? Even if it means less profit for our bottom line? Absolutely." In the same interview, he also stressed the service was for people "lower down on the food chain".

On February 27, 2016, Yesh Music, LLC and John Emanuele from the band The American Dollar launched a $5 million class-action lawsuit that claimed Tidal has yet to compensate the band for any of the royalty payments accrued from the streaming of the band's 116 copyrighted songs. The suit also accused Tidal of using faulty numbers to payout artists while also having undercut these same individuals by 35%. A response from Tidal stated that they are indeed fully up to date on all royalties for the group and have removed said intellectual property from their servers.

Controversy 
In January 2017, Norwegian newspaper Dagens Næringsliv ('Today's Business') reported that it had received internal documents disclosing lower subscriber counts than had been publicly announced by Tidal and its owners, having only 350,000 users in September 2015 (contradicting a claim by Jay-Z that the service had a million users), and 850,000 subscribers by March 2016, rather than the 3 million claimed by the service (which may have been inflated by including users that were using a free trial).

In May 2018, Dagens Næringsliv published a report accusing Tidal of intentionally falsifying streaming numbers for Beyoncé's Lemonade and Kanye West's The Life of Pablo albums and consequently paying inflated royalties to the artists' record labels. The newspaper supported its report with a comprehensive study from Norwegian University of Science and Technology's Center for Cyber and Information Security in Gjøvik. Variety reported, the music service, which "has rarely shared its data publicly", being the exclusive streaming platform for both albums, "claimed that West's album had been streamed 250 million times in its first 10 days of release in February of 2016, while claiming it had just 3 million subscribers – a claim that would have meant every subscriber played the album an average of eight times per day; and that Beyonce's album was streamed 306 million times in its first 15 days of release in April of 2016."

The company denied any wrongdoing. Following the allegations, Norwegian collection society TONO filed an official police complaint against Tidal. Danish music organization Koda has also announced that it would be conducting an independent audit of Tidal data.

False audio quality claims, GoldenSound's test and MQA's response 

After confusion of Tidal and MQA claiming that the MQA encoding is better than the FLAC format and encoding with little to no evidence, a YouTuber known as GoldenSound conducted a series of tests by attempting to publish test audio to the platform, however got rejected because "the MQA encoder was unable to encode the file." GoldenSound then successfully published music with hidden test audio inside of it such as white noise, an impulse response, a square wave, a 32-tone test signal and the RMAA test sequence interspersed with self-produced music. He uploaded a 44.1 kHz version and an 88.2 kHz version, which the MQA encoder should have been able to upload with no loss, distortions or compression. However, after comparing the original master to the MQA encoded one, it was shown that the "mastered" MQA-encoded versions uploaded to Tidal was lossy and had distorted many of the tests and, on the 88.2 kHz version, had added high-frequency noise to the entire file. These files were compared to the same files uploaded to other streaming services, prominently Deezer, which had absolutely no loss or compression added, showing that it was only the MQA encoding that had been worsening the quality of the file. The concluding statement from GoldenSound was that MQA is not lossless, it is lossy and differs from the original master and is not at all how the artist intended for it to be listened to.

The test files uploaded to Tidal were quickly taken down shortly after GoldenSound sent an e-mail to MQA questioning their legitimacy and their recommended methods for encoding to MQA, stating that there is no viable or easy method to test their claims about lossless-ness, even for indie artists.

Musician Neil Young removed his music from Tidal after it had been converted to MQA and misleadingly labeled "Master". Young criticized the audio quality and the MQA business scheme:

Young's discography has since returned to the service.

Model

Platforms 
Tidal has apps available for Microsoft Windows, macOS, iOS and Android compatible devices. Tidal is compatible with Apple TV, Roku, CarPlay, Android TV, and Amazon Fire TV.

Plans

See also 
 Comparison of on-demand music streaming services
 List of Internet radio stations
 List of online music databases
 Qobuz

References

Notes

External links 
 

Jay-Z
Android (operating system) software
Block, Inc.
Internet properties established in 2014
IOS software
Music streaming services
Proprietary software
2014 establishments in Norway